Ernest Charles Fiebelkorn (December 12, 1922 - July 6, 1950)  was a United States Army Air Force fighter ace who was credited with shooting down 9 aircraft during World War II, making him the highest scoring fighter ace of the 20th Fighter Group. He was killed in action in 1950, during the Korean War.

Early life
A grandson of German immigrants, he grew up in Lake Orion, Michigan and his father died when he was 14 years old, leaving Fiebelkorn and his four siblings to be raised by their mother. His mother did not allow him to join the U.S. Army Air Forces and instead she encouraged him to go to college. In 1941 he attended Michigan State College.

Military career
In May 1942, he left college and promptly enlisted in the reserves of the U.S. Army Air Corps on May 21, 1942, and entered the Aviation Cadet Program of the U.S. Army Air Forces on November 8, 1942. Fiebelkorn was commissioned a second lieutenant and awarded his pilot wings at Williams Army Air Field, Arizona, on August 30, 1943.

World War II

After completing P-38 Lightning training, he was assigned to the 79th and then the 77th Fighter Squadron of the 20th Fighter Group in the European Theater of Operations, in January 1944. Flying missions from RAF Kings Cliffe, he was promoted to first lieutenant in May 1944. He was credited with a shared aerial victory of a Focke-Wulf Fw 190 over Reims, France on July 14, 1944.

In July 1944, the 20th FG converted to P-51 Mustangs. Fiebelkorn shot down a Messerschmitt Bf 109 over Hamburg, Germany on August 5, his first solo victory. On September 28, Fiebelkorn shot down three Bf 109s and one Fw 190 over Magdeburg. For his actions, he was awarded the Silver Star. On October 6, he was sent to London to participate, alongside Countess Mountbatten on a radio broadcast of the American Broadcasting System, where he recounted his experiences in combat.

On November 2, during a bomber escort mission over Leipzig, Germany, he shot down three Bf 109s and was awarded a second Silver Star for the mission.  On November 8, he shared in the destruction of a jet-powered Me-262, along with 1st Lieutenant Edward "Buddy" Haydon of the 357th Fighter Group. It was later discovered that the Me-262 had been piloted by German flying ace Major Walter Nowotny, who was credited with 258 aerial victories and was commander of Jagdgeschwader 7, the first operational jet fighter unit in the world.

During World War II, Fiebelkorn was credited with destroying 9 enemy aircraft in aerial combat plus 1 damaged, as well as 2 enemy aircraft on the ground while strafing enemy airfields. His younger brother Roger was killed in action during the war while serving with the 100th Infantry Division in France.

While serving with the 20th FG, he flew P-38J and P-51D bearing the name "June Nite", which were named after his wife June.

Post-war and Korea

After returning to the United States, Fiebelkorn served in airfields in California, Arizona, Washington and Oregon, from February 1945 until he left active duty on February 9, 1947.

He was recalled to active duty with the U.S. Air Force on December 2, 1947, and served with the 2nd Fighter Squadron of the 52nd Fighter Group at Mitchel Field, New York, from December 1947 to December 1948. Fiebelkorn was next assigned to the 82d Fighter Squadron at Hamilton Air Force Base, California, where he served from December 1948 to February 1949.

Fiebelkorn joined the 4th Fighter Squadron of the 51st Fighter Group at Naha Air Base, Japan, in April 1949. Following the outbreak of the Korean War in June 1950, he began flying missions in the F-82 Twin Mustang. On July 6, 1950, Fiebelkorn was flying as part of a four-ship element sent to locate and strafe advancing enemy ground forces through heavy low overcast at the Suwon-Seoul area. After hours of searching with no results, he reported that he was going to descend lower in the mountainous terrain hoping to find an opening in the dense cloud cover. Fiebelkorn and his radar operator Captain John J. Higgins were listed MIA when they failed to return to base.

In 1953, Fiebelkorn and Higgins' remains were found by UN troops on a mountainside approximately 40 miles north of Seoul. Fiebelkorn was buried with full military honors at Arlington National Cemetery. He was also posthumously awarded a third Disitinguished Flying Cross with Valor device. Fiebelkorn was survived by his wife June and son Eric.

Aerial victory credits

SOURCES: Air Force Historical Study 85: USAF Credits for the Destruction of Enemy Aircraft, World War II

Awards and decorations 
His awards include:

Congressional Gold Medal (2015)

See also
List of World War II aces from the United States
List of World War II flying aces

References

Notes

Further reading

1922 births
1950 deaths
American Korean War pilots
American military personnel killed in the Korean War]
American people of German descent
American World War II flying aces
Military personnel from Michigan
United States Air Force personnel of the Korean War
Recipients of the Distinguished Flying Cross (United States)
People from Pontiac, Michigan
Aviators from Michigan
Recipients of the Silver Star
Recipients of the Croix de Guerre 1939–1945 (France)
Recipients of the Air Medal
United States Army Air Forces pilots of World War II
Burials at Arlington National Cemetery
People from Lake Orion, Michigan
Military personnel missing in action